Mike Dillon (a.k.a. Mike D) is an American percussionist, vibraphonist, bandleader, and vocalist born in San Antonio, Texas. He is a member of Critters Buggin, Les Claypool's Fancy Band and Garage A Trois. He has performed with many musicians including Ani DiFranco, Galactic, Brave Combo, Karl Denson's Tiny Universe, Marco Benevento, Claude Coleman Jr., and New Orleans musicians  Kevin O'Day, Johnny Vidacovich and James Singleton.

Dillon's love of playing percussion was born out of his love for the band Rush as a teenager. He originally performed in the 80's with local Dallas and Denton favorites Ten Hands. At the time, he was a casual drug user. Later when he led the 1990s Dallas-based Billy Goat, he and his girlfriend (who he later married) became heroin addicts who began missing gigs and eventually were "on the verge of death". The band's management sent him to rehab, but he "only lasted three days". In the late 1990s, Billy Goat disbanded and he performed in the Kansas City-based Malachy Papers and the Austin-based Hairy Apes BMX (HABMX). Dillon quit heroin in 2000, and split with his wife around that time.

In 2006, Dillon started a funky project "Mike Dillon's Go-Go Jungle" which included members of Billy Goat, drummer Go-Go Ray, and bassist, J.J. Jungle. The live Go-Go Jungle also performs songs from Dillon's prior projects. They released their second CD entitled Rock Star Bench Press in 2009.

Dillon contributed the majority of compositions to Garage A Trois' Power Patriot CD released in 2009.

Dillon and saxophonist Skerik perform as a trio called "The Dead Kenny G's" with alternate third members. National tours have included keyboardist Brian Haas and bassist Brad Houser. With Houser they have also toured as "Critters Buggin Trio". They released a CD entitled Bewildered Herd in 2009. As a trio with bassist James Singleton, Dillon and Skerik have toured as "Illuminasti" and as a trio with Les Claypool they have been billed as "The Fancy Trio".

Dillon is married to artist Peregrine Honig, whom he resides with in Kansas City and New Orleans, but a busy touring schedule keeps him on the road much of the time.

Discography 
 Black Frames Solarallergy (2002)
 Mike Dillon (2003)
 Mike Dillon's Go-Go Jungle Battery Milk (2007)
 The Dead Kenny G's Bewildered Herd (2009)
 Mike Dillon's Go-Go Jungle Rock Star Bench Press (2009)
 Mike Dillon and Earl Harvin People Gardens (2010 – recorded 2005)
 The Dead Kenny G's Operation Long Leash (2011)
 Mike Dillon Urn (2012)
 The Dead Kenny G's Gorelick (2012)
 DVS [Mike Dillon, Johnny Vidacovich, James Singleton] "Bones"
 Mike Dillon Band of Outsider (2014)
 Nolatet "Dogs" (2016)
 Mike Dillon Functioning Broke (2016)
 Mike Dillon Life is Not a Football (2017)
 Nolatet  No Revenge Necessary (2018)
 Mike Dillon   Bonobo   (2018)
 Mike Dillon  Roseweood  (2019)
 Mike Dillon & Punkadelic  Shoot the Moon (2020)
 Mike Dillon & The Bad Decisions  Suitcase Man (2020)
 Mike Dillon 1918 (2020)

See also discographies 
 Billy Goat
 Hairy Apes BMX
 Malachy Papers
 Critters Buggin
 Garage A Trois

With others 
 Ten Hands Kung Fu ... That's What I Like (1988)
 Ten Hands The Big One Is Coming (1989)
 MC 900 Ft Jesus One Step Ahead of the Spider (1994)
 Groove Collective (Reprise/Giant Step, 1994) U.S. Jazz No. 20
 Ten Hands The Big One That Got Away (1996)
 Pigface The Best of Pigface: Preaching to the Perverted (2001)
 Karl Denson The Bridge (2002)
 Les Claypool Purple Onion  (2002)
 Les Claypool Of Whales and Woe (2006)
 Ani DiFranco Canon (2007)
 Marco Benevento Live at Tonic (2007)
 Ani DiFranco Red Letter Year (2008)
 Santogold Santogold (2008)
 Les Claypool Of Fungi and Foe (2009)
 Ani Difranco "Which Side Are You On" (2012)
 Wavves "Afraid of Heights" (2013)
 Secret Chiefs 3 (Ishraqiyun) Perichoresis (2014)
 Primus Primus & the Chocolate Factory with the Fungi Ensemble (2014)
 Karl Denson New Ammo  (2014)
 The Revivalist Men Amongst Mountains (2015)
 Stanton Moore "With You in Mind" (2017)
 Robert Walter's 20th Congress Spacesuit (2018)
 Clutch Book of Bad Decisions (2018)
 The Dean Ween Group  rock2 (2018)
  Rickie Lee Jones    Kicks  2019
  Karl Denson's Tiny Universe  Gnomes and Badgers  (2019)
 The Iceman Special  Circular Purple Circus  (2021)

References 

  - focus on Hairy Apes BMX and Billy Goat
 Interview at Jambase, Dennis Cook, 2002
  - focus on Go-Go Jungle
  focus on the bands Mike Dillon has toured with.

External links 
 Official website

Year of birth missing (living people)
Living people
American bandleaders
American percussionists
American vibraphonists
Musicians from San Antonio
Pigface members
Go-go musicians
Colonel Les Claypool's Fearless Flying Frog Brigade members
Critters Buggin members
Les Claypool's Fancy Band members
Garage A Trois members